"Land of a Thousand Words" is the second single from the American band, the Scissor Sisters' second album, Ta-Dah. It is the fifth track of Ta-Dah, and it was released on 4 December 2006 in the UK and Ireland. The single was released and charted in various European countries including Germany, Austria, Italy, Poland, Norway and the Czech Republic.

Unlike the first release off the album "I Don't Feel Like Dancin'", "Land of a Thousand Words" is a slow ballad track. The video for the song, directed by Brumby Boylston and Chris Dooley of National Television, is a homage to the James Bond film title sequences (in the style of Robert Brownjohn and Maurice Binder), featuring all of the band, and the credits for the music video itself.

Track listing

10-inch vinyl square picture disc
 "Land of a Thousand Words" – 3:50

UK CD single
 "Land of a Thousand Words" – 3:50
 "Land of a Thousand Words" (Junkie XL remix) – 5:17

International CD single
 "Land of a Thousand Words" – 3:50
 "Hair Baby" – 4:06
 "Land of a Thousand Words" (Junkie XL remix) – 5:17
 "Land of a Thousand Words" (music video)

UK iTunes digital single
 "Land of a Thousand Words" – 3:50
 "Land of a Thousand Words" (Sébastien Tellier's Run to the Sun Mix) – 3:57

Official remixes
 "Land of a Thousand Words" (Junkie XL remix)
 "Land of a Thousand Words" (Junkie XL remix edit)
 "Land of a Thousand Words" (Sebastien Tellier's Run to the Sun Mix)

Charts

References

External links
 Official website
 Underground Illusion - The Ultimate Scissor Sisters Database

2000s ballads
2006 singles
Scissor Sisters songs
2006 songs
Songs written by Jake Shears
Songs written by Babydaddy
Polydor Records singles